Hadley Cote & The Old Cottage are grade II listed buildings on Hadley Green Road to the north of Chipping Barnet.

References

External links 

http://www.statons.com/property/100183525431059/hadley-green-road-hadley-highstone-hertfordshire/ 

Grade II listed buildings in the London Borough of Barnet
Houses in the London Borough of Barnet
Chipping Barnet